Pana is a Gur language of Burkina Faso and Mali.

References

Gurunsi languages
Languages of Mali
Languages of Burkina Faso